Park Chu-young (also romanised as Park Ju-young; born 10 July 1985) is a South Korean footballer who plays for Ulsan Hyundai as a forward.

Club career

FC Seoul
In February 2005, Park joined a K League club FC Seoul with the highest salary among rookie players. In his first season, he scored 18 goals and provided 4 assists in 30 appearances (including the Korean League Cup), receiving the K League Young Player of the Year award by common consent for the first time in K League history. However, he underperformed the next year because his weaknesses were exposed by other teams. In the 2007 season, he played only 15 games due to his on-and-off foot injury. He also missed the FC Seoul's friendly match with Manchester United during the time of his injury.

Monaco
On 1 September 2008, Park completed a move to Monaco. On 13 September, he scored on his debut against Lorient in the 26th minute. In the 2nd half, he assisted his teammate Frédéric Nimani's goal before being substituted. The game ended 2–0, and Park was named as the Man of the Match. In his first season at Monaco, he went on to make 31 appearances, scoring five times.

In his second season at Monaco, Park scored three goals in the first half of the season. On 30 January 2010, Park signed a three-year contract with Monaco that would keep him until 2013. Despite having three injuries during the season, Park remained on the first team, as he scored eight goals in twenty-seven appearances.

His last season at Monaco gave him mixed results. Park scored five goals in the first half of the season. But then, after scoring against Sochaux, Park celebrated, which resulted him injuring his right knee and kept him out for four weeks. On 13 February 2011, Park scored his seventh goal of the season in a 3–1 win over Lorient. Thirteen days later, Park scored a brace in a 2–2 home draw over Caen. He made a good display in the 2010–11 season, scoring twelve league goals, the club, however, was relegated to Ligue 2 after finishing 18th place in the league. The relegation led Park to announce his desire to leave Monaco to play in a competitive league. This was followed up by the club, who stated they wouldn't stand in Park's way from leaving the club.

Arsenal

In somewhat strange circumstances on 30 August 2011, English Premier League club Arsenal signed Park. It is believed Chu-Young became aware of Arsenal's interest and departed his hotel room without finishing a medical with the Ligue 1 club Lille. He was given the number 9 shirt. On 25 October 2011, he scored his first goal for Arsenal in the fourth round of the Football League Cup in a 2–1 home win against Bolton Wanderers On 1 November, Chu-young started his first UEFA Champions League match, a 0–0 draw against French outfit Marseille. On 22 January 2012, he made his Premier league debut as a substitute, coming on at 82 minutes into a 2–1 home defeat against Manchester United. On 6 March 2012, he made an appearance as a substitute for Theo Walcott in the Champions League, in the 3–0 win against Milan at the Emirates Stadium, though Milan won 4–3 on aggregate.

On 8 August 2012, it was confirmed that the forward had been reassigned the number 30 shirt, with new signing Lukas Podolski taking over the number 9. Following a loan spell at Celta Vigo, Park was advised by newly national coach Hong Myung-bo to leave the club if Park was to remain in the national team. Park did not play a game for Arsenal for another 14 months until 30 October 2013 when he came on as a substitute for Aaron Ramsey on the 81st minute against Chelsea in the League Cup. Arsenal lost the game 2–0. Although there was a discussion of a possible loan move to Wigan Athletic, the deal never materialized.

From that point forward, Park did not make any further appearances in the league with the first team. Park was released by the club on a free transfer on 30 June 2014. As a result of his flop at Arsenal, Daily Telegraph reporter John Duerden would compare Park move to Arsenal as "the worst call to answer since Colin Farrell picked up a New York public phone in Phone Booth and endured a few hours of misery."

Loan spells
Amidst reported interest from Blackburn Rovers and Al-Hilal and rumours of being linked to Nottingham Forest, on 31 August 2012, Park moved to Celta de Vigo on a season-long loan from Arsenal for the 2012–13 La Liga season. He was given the number 18 shirt. On 22 September 2012, he scored his first goal in his home debut in a 2–1 victory over Getafe, becoming the first South Korean player ever to score a goal in La Liga. Park would then score two more goals against Mallorca and Deportivo de La Coruña in the Galician derby. Park would injure his right foot, which put him the end to this season and went on to score three goals in twenty one appearance.

On 31 January 2014, Park was loaned to Championship side Watford for the remainder of the 2013–14 season. Park made his Watford debut as a 90th-minute substitute for Fernando Forestieri in the 2–0 win against Brighton & Hove Albion on 2 February 2014 and then made his first start for Watford in a 2–0 away loss against Bolton Wanderers on 22 February 2014 before he came off in the second half. However, Park only made two appearances for the club after sustaining injuries to his thigh and toe.

Al-Shabab
Despite his intention to stay in Europe after being released by Arsenal, Park joined Saudi Arabian side Al-Shabab on 1 October 2014, signing a one-year contract. Park scored on his debut, in a 1–0 victory against Al-Hilal on 17 October 2014.

Return to FC Seoul
Park returned to FC Seoul on 10 March 2015. On 6 November 2016, he scored the only goal for FC Seoul in a 1–0 away victory against Jeonbuk Hyundai Motors in the final round of the season, helping his team to win the 2016 K League 1.

International career

Youth career
Park Chu-young was chosen as the Most Valuable Player of the 2004 AFC Youth Championship after leading the South Korean under-20 team to the title. In the 2005 FIFA World Youth Championship, he scored a goal with a free kick against Nigeria. He also participated in the 2008 Summer Olympics with the under-23 team, scoring a free kick again against Cameroon.

2010 World Cup
Park Chu-young was South Korea's first-choice striker in the 2010 FIFA World Cup. He scored an own goal in a 4–1 defeat to Argentina, but Park redeemed himself by scoring a crucial free kick in a 2–2 draw with Nigeria. In the round of 16, Park's free kick just before halftime struck Uruguay's post, and South Korea eventually lost 2–1.

2010 Asian Games
Park, along with Kim Jung-woo, was called to the under-23 team to participate in the 2010 Asian Games held in Guangzhou. The team was led by former national team captain Hong Myung-bo. Park did not play in the first game against North Korea, which ended in a 1–0 loss. He came off the bench in the next game against Jordan, which South Korea won 4–0. He started the last group game against Palestine, in which he scored the second goal in the 3–0 victory before being substituted. South Korea advanced to the knockout round, having finished second place in Group C with six points. In their next match against China, Park played the entire game, scoring a goal in the 50th minute to help South Korea to a 3–0 win. In the quarterfinal match against Uzbekistan, Park was once again influential in leading Korea to victory. Park scored his third goal of the tournament a few minutes into the first period of extra time, after the teams played to a 1–1 draw in normal time. South Korea eventually won the game 3–1, and Park was substituted in the 108th minute. Although Park played in the semifinal match against UAE, he was unable to find the net and South Korea lost 1–0 after UAE scored in the last minute of extra time. In the bronze medal game against Iran, Park scored his fourth goal of the tournament. With South Korea trailing 3–1, Park tapped in the ball from a cross to bring the score to 3–2. South Korea eventually won 4–3 to secure the bronze medal, with two goals from Ji Dong-won.

2011 Asian Cup
Although Park had been listed on the roster for the 2011 AFC Asian Cup, he was unable to participate due to an injury and was replaced on the roster by Ji Dong-won. Following the tournament, he was named captain of the national team to replace the retiring Park Ji-sung. But in 2012, newly appointed head coach Choi Kang-hee named Lee Jung-soo as captain of the national side, replacing Park Chu-young.

2012 Summer Olympics
In October 2011, Park announced that he would have to leave Arsenal in two years' time to serve in the military, which would halt his football career. In March 2012, however, the South Korean Military Manpower Administration announced that Park could postpone his service until 2022, because he qualified for a long-term residency in Monaco. This meant that his mandatory military service was exempted under South Korean law, which requires military service only from domestic men under the age of 35. When controversy over his postponement of military service erupted, he denied avoiding conscription and promised to fulfill his obligation.

Park was selected for the South Korean Olympic team as an over-aged player by the manager Hong Myung-bo, participating in the 2012 Summer Olympics. He scored the opening goal in a group match against Switzerland, contributing to a crucial victory towards the quarter-finals. In the bronze medal match against Japan, he scored the winning goal with a solo effort against three Japanese defenders. Olympic medalists could be exempted from the military service in South Korea, and so he was honorably exempted from it with his effort.

2014 World Cup
Despite not playing regular first-team football for several years, Park was included in the South Korea national squad for the 2014 FIFA World Cup. He played in the matches against Russia and Algeria. His performances were heavily criticized, particularly because he registered no shots on target in either match. He was replaced by Kim Shin-wook for the team's final match against Belgium. The other South Korean players who won a bronze medal in the 2012 Summer Olympics also did not perform well in the manager's set-up.

Personal life
Park is a Christian. He writes "Jesus Christ" next to his autograph and has spoken about his faith saying, "The first and main reason why I play football is to evangelise people."

Career statistics

Club

International 

Scores and results list South Korea's goal tally first, score column indicates score after each Park goal.

Honours
FC Seoul
K League Classic: 2016
Korean FA Cup: 2015
Korean League Cup: 2006

Monaco
Coupe de France runner-up: 2009–10

Ulsan Hyundai
K League 1: 2022

South Korea U20
AFC Youth Championship: 2004

South Korea U23
Summer Olympics bronze medal: 2012
Asian Games bronze medal: 2010

South Korea
EAFF Championship: 2008

Individual
AFC Youth Championship Most Valuable Player: 2004
AFC Youth Championship top goalscorer: 2004
AFC Youth Player of the Year: 2004
K League All-Star Game Most Valuable Player: 2005
K League Rookie of the Year: 2005
K League 1 Best XI: 2005
EAFF Championship top goalscorer: 2008
Korean FA Goal of the Year: 2008, 2012

References

External links

 Park Chuyoung – National Team Stats at KFA 
 
 
 
 
 
 

1985 births
Living people
Sportspeople from Daegu
South Korean footballers
South Korean expatriate footballers
South Korea under-20 international footballers
South Korea under-23 international footballers
South Korea international footballers
Association football forwards
FC Seoul players
AS Monaco FC players
Arsenal F.C. players
RC Celta de Vigo players
Watford F.C. players
Al-Shabab FC (Riyadh) players
Ulsan Hyundai FC players
2014 FIFA World Cup players
K League 1 players
Ligue 1 players
Premier League players
La Liga players
English Football League players
Expatriate footballers in Monaco
Expatriate footballers in England
Expatriate footballers in Spain
Expatriate footballers in Saudi Arabia
2006 FIFA World Cup players
2010 FIFA World Cup players
South Korean expatriate sportspeople in Monaco
South Korean expatriate sportspeople in England
South Korean expatriate sportspeople in Spain
South Korean expatriate sportspeople in Saudi Arabia
Korea University alumni
Olympic footballers of South Korea
Olympic medalists in football
Olympic bronze medalists for South Korea
Footballers at the 2008 Summer Olympics
Footballers at the 2012 Summer Olympics
Medalists at the 2012 Summer Olympics
Asian Young Footballer of the Year winners
Asian Games medalists in football
Asian Games bronze medalists for South Korea
Footballers at the 2006 Asian Games
Footballers at the 2010 Asian Games
Medalists at the 2010 Asian Games
Saudi Professional League players
South Korean Christians